Exo is a South Korean–Chinese boy band from Seoul, South Korea, formed in 2011. The band consists of nine members: Xiumin, Suho, Lay, Baekhyun, Chen, Chanyeol, D.O., Kai, and Sehun. As of November 2019, they have released seven studio albums and six extended plays (EP) in Korean, Mandarin, and Japanese. Exo achieved success with the release of their debut EP Mama in 2012. It won them many awards and nominations, including Best New Asian Artist and a nomination for Artist of the Year at the 2012 Mnet Asian Music Awards. They were also nominated for Rookie of the Year at the 2013 Korean Music awards and won the New Artist Award at the 2013 Seoul Music Awards.

Exo's first studio album XOXO was released in June 2013 and received various awards, including their first Daesang award. In South Korea's music industry, a Daesang award is the "grand prize" of an award ceremony. The album won Album of the Year at the 2013 Mnet Asian Music Awards and Disc Daesang at the 2014 Golden Disc Awards. "Growl", a single on the album, won Song of the Year at the 2013 Melon Music Awards. Exo have continued receiving awards and nominations in the years since, and as of January 2019, they have accumulated 23 Daesang awards from various award shows. These include several sets of consecutive wins for the same award: five consecutive Album of the Year wins at the Mnet Asian Music Awards, four consecutive Disc Daesang wins at the Golden Disc Awards, four consecutive Daesang wins at the Seoul Music Awards, and two consecutive Artist of the Year wins at the Melon Music Awards.

Exo have also won over 100 music program awards, which are awarded on weekly television shows in South Korea and China to the artist with the most popular and best performing song in the country that week. In 2017, Exo received a Prime Minister's Commendation award at the Korean Popular Culture & Arts Awards, which was given in recognition of public service or excellence in their field. With five wins at the time, Exo earned an entry in the 2018 Guinness World Records book for the "Most Daesang ("Grand Prize") awards won at the Mnet Asian Music Awards". Exo were also named by Forbes on their Korea Power Celebrity list as the most powerful celebrities in South Korea for 2015 and 2016, and within the top five for 2014, 2017 and 2018. Overall, Exo has received 178 awards from 319 nominations.

Awards and nominations

Other accolades

State and cultural honors

Listicles

World records

See also
 
 
 Byun Baek-hyun#Awards and nominations

Notes

References

Exo
Awards